A Little Good News is the eighteenth studio album by Canadian country pop artist Anne Murray, released in 1983 via Capitol Records. The album peaked at number 9 on the Billboard Top Country Albums chart and was quickly certified Gold by the RIAA.

The title track topped the Country singles charts in the United States. "That's Not the Way (It's S'posed to Be)" and "Just Another Woman in Love" were released as follow-up singles, with the latter hitting #1.

In 1984, A Little Good News was honored with a CMA Award for 'Album of the Year'.

Track listing

Personnel 
 Anne Murray – lead vocals, backing  vocals (2, 5, 8, 10)
 Michael Boddicker – synthesizers (1, 9, 10)
 Jack Lenz – synthesizers (1, 2, 6), electric piano (4, 7, 9, 10)
 Doug Riley – acoustic piano (2, 4, 5, 7, 8), electric piano (6)
 Dennis Burnside – electric piano (3, 8), synthesizers (5)
 Bobby Ogdin – acoustic piano (3)
 Mike "Pepe" Francis – electric guitar (1, 2, 9, 10), acoustic guitar (2, 6, 7), guitar (4)
 Bob Mann – electric guitar (1, 7, 9, 10), acoustic guitar (2, 6), guitar (4)
 Steve Gibson – electric guitar (2, 3, 5, 8)
 Rafe Van Hoy – acoustic guitar (3, 5, 8)
 Paul Worley – acoustic guitar (3, 8), electric guitar (3, 5)
 Tom Szczesniak – bass (2, 4, 6, 7, 9, 10)
 Joe Osborn – bass (3, 5, 8)
 Barry Keane – drums (1, 2, 4, 6, 7, 9, 10)
 Eddie Bayers – drums (3, 5, 8)
 Bryan Cumming – saxophone (9)
 Nick DeCaro – string arrangements and conductor (3)
 Rick Wilkins – string arrangements and conductor (4)
 Peter Cardinali – string arrangements and conductor (8)
 Bill Champlin – backing vocals (1, 9)
 Tom Kelly – backing vocals (1, 9)
 Bruce Murray – backing vocals (2, 10)
 Deborah Schaal Greimann – backing vocals (2, 5, 8, 10)
 Tom Brannon – backing vocals (3)
 Philip Forrest – backing vocals (3)
 Donna Sheridan – backing vocals (3)
 Lisa Silver – backing vocals (3)
 Randy Sharp – backing vocals (6)

Production 
 Jim Ed Norman – producer 
 Balmur Ltd. – executive producer
 Ken Friesen – recording 
 Marshall Morgan – additional recording, mixing
 Eric Prestidge – additional recording
 Larry Hines – additional recording, recording assistant 
 Richard McKernon – additional recording, recording assistant 
 Giles Reeves – additional recording, recording assistant 
 Tom Henderson – recording assistant 
 Ken Perry – mastering 
 Paul Cade – art direction, design 
 Bill King – photography 

Studios
 Recorded at Eastern Sound (Toronto, Ontario, Canada); Audio Media Recorders (Nashville, Tennessee, USA); Redwing Studios (Tarzana, California, USA); Sunset Sound (Hollywood, California, USA).
 Mixed at Emerald Sound Studios (Nashville, Tennessee, USA).
 Mastered at Masterfonics (Nashville, Tennessee, USA).

Charts

Weekly charts

Year-end charts

Certifications

References

1983 albums
Anne Murray albums
Albums produced by Jim Ed Norman
Capitol Records albums